Napaeus barquini is a species of air-breathing land snail, a terrestrial pulmonate gastropod mollusk in the family Enidae.
Endemic fauna of the Canary Islands

Distribution 
This species is endemic to La Gomera in the Canary Islands.

Ecology 
Napaeus barquini lives on open rocks.

Napaeus barquini actively adds lichens to its shell as a camouflage.

References

Enidae
Gastropods described in 2006